Ardmayle is a civil parish, village and townland in County Tipperary. It is situated near Boherlahan, Goolds Cross and Cashel. It is located on the River Suir and was once served by a railway station on the Goolds Cross Cashel railway. It was the only stop between the two stations.

Location
Ardmayle is situated approximately 6 km from Cashel, which is accessible from the local road that goes through the village.

Notable people
Charles Bianconi lived in Longfield House which is in the civil parish.
Walter Butler of Nodstown also lived in the civil parish

See also
List of civil parishes of Tipperary

References 

Towns and villages in County Tipperary
Civil parishes of Middle Third, County Tipperary